John Sturgeon (by 1498 – 1570/71), of London, was an English politician.

Family
Sturgeon was married to Joan by 1522. They had at least three sons and two daughters.

Career
He was a Member (MP) of the Parliament of England for London in 1542 and 1545 and Hindon in 1547.

He was Chamberlain of London from 1550 to 1563.

He was buried at St Benet Gracechurch, in the Bridge ward.

References

15th-century births
1571 deaths
English MPs 1542–1544
English MPs 1545–1547
English MPs 1547–1552
Members of the Parliament of England for the City of London